Tony Bennett (born 1947) is a British sociologist who has held academic positions in the United Kingdom and Australia. His work focusses on cultural studies and cultural history.

Early life and education
Bennett was born in Manchester and earned a BA in Politics, Philosophy and Economics at Oxford University in 1968 and a PhD in Sociology at Sussex University in 1972.

Career
In the 1970s and early 1980s, Bennett taught sociology at the Open University in the United Kingdom, as a staff tutor and then as chair of the Popular Culture course.

He then moved to Griffith University in Brisbane, where he was Professor of Cultural Studies, Dean of Humanities, and director of the ARC Key Centre for Cultural and Media Policy until 1998.

In 1998 he returned to the Open University, where he was Professor of Sociology and a founding director of the ESRC Centre for Research on Socio-cultural Change (CRESC). 

In 2009 he returned to Australia as Research Professor in Social and Cultural Theory at the Institute for Culture and Society at Western Sydney University, while remaining a Visiting Research Professor at the Open University and an associate member of CRESC. He has also been a visiting professor at universities in the United States, China, and Canada.

His work has been important in literary and popular culture studies, especially as a founder of the Australian school of cultural policy studies.  He is a member of the Australian Academy of the Humanities.

Publications
Bennett's 1992 essay, "Putting Policy into Cultural Studies", was seminal.

His books include:
Formalism and Marxism (1979), on Marxist literary criticism
Outside Literature (1990)
The Birth of the Museum: History, Theory, Politics (1995), a study of the origins and cultural function of the modern museum
Culture: A Reformer's Science (1998), a reexamination of cultural policy studies
Culture in Australia: Policies, Publics, Programs (ed., with David Carter, 2001)
Understanding Everyday Life (ed., with Diane Watson, 2002), textbook for their Open University core course in sociology
Pasts Beyond Memories: Evolution, Museums, Colonialism (2004)
Making Culture, Changing Society (2013)
Museums, Power, Knowledge: Selected Essays (2018)

References

1947 births
Living people
People from Manchester
Academics of the Open University
Academic staff of Griffith University
Academic staff of Western Sydney University
Australian sociologists
British sociologists
Alumni of the University of Oxford
Alumni of the University of Sussex